State Highway 36 (SH 36) is a State Highway in Kerala, India that starts in Taliparamba and ends in Iritty. The highway is 46.0 km long. This road links interstate highway between Kannur district and Kodagu district.

The Route Map 
(Joins NH 66) Chiravakk - Sreekandapuram - Irikkur - Padiyoor - Iritty (Joins SH 30)

See also 
Roads in Kerala
List of State Highways in Kerala

References 

State Highways in Kerala
Roads in Kannur district